Haeteriinae is a subfamily of clown beetles in the family Histeridae. There are more than 110 genera and 330 described species in Haeteriinae.

See also
 List of Haeteriinae genera

References

Further reading

External links

 

Histeridae